Sir John Houston, 3rd Baronet (or Houstoun; died 1722), of Houstoun, Renfrew, and Glasgow, Lanarkshire, was a Scottish Tory politician who sat in the House of Commons between 1708 and 1715. He was a Jacobite.

Biography
Houston was the only son of Sir John Houston, 2nd Baronet, of Houston, Renfrewshire, and his wife Anne Drummond, daughter of John Drummond, 1st Earl of Melfort. He was educated at Glasgow. In 1717, he  succeeded his father to the baronetcy in 1717.

Houston was elected as Member of Parliament for Linlithgowshire at a by-election on 22 December 1708. He was returned again at the 1710 British general election. At the 1713 British general election he was defeated in the poll, but was seated on petition on 8 April 1714 He was a Commissary of Glasgow by 1714. .

Private life

Houstoun married in 1713, Margaret Schaw, the daughter of Sir John Schaw, 2nd Bt., of Greenock, Renfrew and had a son and two daughters. He died in on 27 January 1722 and was succeeded by his son.

References

1722 deaths
People from Renfrewshire
Alumni of the University of Glasgow
Baronets in the Baronetage of Nova Scotia
Scottish Jacobites
Members of the Parliament of Great Britain for Scottish constituencies
British MPs 1708–1710
British MPs 1710–1713
British MPs 1713–1715